The United States Olympic & Paralympic Training Centers (OPTCs) are two campuses created by the United States Olympic & Paralympic Committee (USOPC) as training facilities for its Olympic and Paralympic athletes. They are located in Colorado Springs, Colorado and Lake Placid, New York. Formerly, the USOPC also had an OPTC in Chula Vista, California, which is now a training site known as the Elite Athlete Training Center. There is a U.S. Olympic Education Center in Marquette, Michigan, and other official U.S. Olympic/Paralympic training sites are located in Oklahoma City and Edmond, Oklahoma; Carson, California; Lakeshore Foundation in Birmingham, Alabama; Charlotte, North Carolina; the Pettit National Ice Center in West Allis, Wisconsin; a USRowing training center in Oakland, California - previously in Princeton, New Jersey; Huntsville, Texas and the SPIRE Institute and Academy near Geneva, Ohio.

Some athletes preparing for the Olympics, Paralympics, and Pan American Games live at one of the OPTCs for a period of months or years, while others visit periodically with their respective national teams for training camps, coaching (especially in sports science and sports psychology), or physical testing. Foreign national teams are also granted use of the USOPTCs.

The USOPTCs are all open to the general public for tourism, and they are the only facilities for Olympic training in the world to do so.

Colorado Springs

The Colorado Springs OPTC was the first to be built, and has been the home of the U.S. Olympic & Paralympic Committee since 1978.  Its location on the former Ent Air Force Base was selected for its relatively high elevation, which is often thought to improve training effectiveness. Its facilities include an Olympic-size swimming pool, an indoor shooting range, the Olympic Training Center Velodrome, two sports centers housing numerous gymnasiums and weight rooms, and a sports science laboratory, in addition to an athlete center and dining hall, several dormitories, a visitors' center, and the offices of both the USOPC and U.S. Paralympics. The center hosts Warrior Games competition each year.

Lake Placid
The Lake Placid OPTC facility opened in November 1982, two years after hosting the 1980 Winter Games. The LPOPTC is home to four resident sports: Bobsled/Skeleton, Luge, Freestyle Ski, and Biathlon. Athletes from boxing, canoe and kayak, judo, rowing, synchronized swimming, taekwondo, team handball, water polo and wrestling also train frequently on site.

Chula Vista

As of January 2017, the training center is owned by the City of Chula Vista, and has been renamed Chula Vista Elite Athlete Training Center. The United States Olympic & Paralympic Committee will continue funding athlete programming at the center at least through 2020.

The 150-acre campus features sport venues and support facilities for eight Olympic sports: archery, canoe/kayak, cycling, field hockey, rowing, soccer, softball and track & field. In June 1995, the training center, then known as ARCO Training Center for sponsorship reasons, was open. Over the years more facilities, such as beach volleyball courts and a BMX track, were added. 
The Chula Vista center is also home to the annual SoCal Showdown, a national-level archery tournament that attracts archers from around the country to compete in a several day competition consisting of qualifications and eliminations.

References

External links
 US Olympic Committee website
 

Olympic Training Center
Olympic Games in New York (state)
Sports venues in California
Sports venues in San Diego County, California
United States at the Olympics
Buildings and structures in Essex County, New York
Cycle racing in the United States
Tourist attractions in El Paso County, Colorado
Handball venues in the United States